Shane Rose (born 24 April 1973 in Sydney) is a three-time Olympic medallst. He started riding at the age of five at the Forest Hills Pony Club. Rose lived with his parents and three siblings in Duffys Forest, New South Wales. He was educated at Newington College Preparatory School, Lindfield (1978–83), and Pittwater House. Rose's love for horses continued to grow, and at 21 years of age he represented Australia in the Young Rider Trans-Tasman competition with Mr Joe Cool.

As a 23 year old he was selected to represent Australia in Eventing at the 1996 Olympic Games in Atlanta. However, his horse went lame upon arrival in the US preventing him from competing. The Australian team went on to win gold. Since then he has competed at many prestigious competitions around the world, including success at the 2008 Beijing Olympics, where Rose and his horse All Luck were part of the team the Silver Medal for Eventing. He also competed at the 2016 Summer Olympics where he won a team bronze and the Tokyo 2020 Olympics where he won team silver.

He competed in the individual eventing and team eventing at the 2020 Summer Olympics in Tokyo. The team of Andrew Hoy on Vassily de Lassos, Shane Rose on Virgil and Kevin McNab on Don Quidam won silver. Riding on Virgil Rose finished inside the top 15 in the individual eventing competition.

He was once kicked in the head by a horse which left him in a coma for a week.

Horses 

 Beauford Miss Dior – 1986 Bay Mare
 2004 Adelaide CCI**** Winner

 All Luck – 1994 Bay Thoroughbred Gelding
 2008 Beijing Olympics – Team Silver Medal, Individual 27th place
 Taurus – 2002 Bay Warmblood Gelding (Aries)
 2014 World Equestrian Games – Team Fourth place, Individual 34th place
 CP Qualified – 2003 Gray Holsteiner Gelding (Quite Capitol x Corofino I)
 2015 Adelaide CCI**** Winner
 2016 Rio Olympics – Team Bronze Medal

References

External links
 Australian Olympic Committee profile
 Bimbadeen Park – About Shane

1973 births
Living people
Australian event riders
Equestrians at the 2008 Summer Olympics
Equestrians at the 2016 Summer Olympics
Equestrians at the 2020 Summer Olympics
Olympic equestrians of Australia
Australian male equestrians
Olympic silver medalists for Australia
Olympic medalists in equestrian
People educated at Newington College
Medalists at the 2008 Summer Olympics
Medalists at the 2016 Summer Olympics
Medalists at the 2020 Summer Olympics
Olympic bronze medalists for Australia
21st-century Australian people